Gonystylus othmanii is a tree in the family Thymelaeaceae.

Description
The bark is greyish brown.

Distribution and habitat
Gonystylus othmanii is endemic to Borneo where it is known only from Sarawak.

References

othmanii
Endemic flora of Borneo
Trees of Borneo
Flora of Sarawak
Plants described in 1999